Hiwarkhed is one of the largest towns in Akola District belonging to Telhara taluka, in the Indian state of Maharashtra. Hiwarkhed (Orange City) has a population of 23,000.

Hiwarkhed is one of the largest villages, hosting 5 schools, including 2 convents (English medium). This Town is bordered by Pak River which meets the Nal Damayanti Sagar .

Culture 
Hiwarkhed has many temples. The RadhaKrishna temple is the largest.

The village has a public library.

Economy 
The village hosts many orange orchards whose produce is widely exported.

Health care 
A government hospital provides health care. The hospital won the Anandebai Joshi award. This Primary Health Centre was converted into A Health and Wellness Centre (आरोग्यवर्धिनी केंद्र).

Transport

Rail
Planning for the 140-km Narkhed and Amravati railroad began in 1928 under the British. The project was revived only in 1993–94 with a budget of Rs 2.84 billion. Then-Prime Minister P.V. Narasimha Rao laid the foundation stone. Protests by the Shiv Sena, which opposed the required displacement of people, stalled the project.

In September 2008, President Pratibha Patil inaugurated the New Amravati station. In November 2009, the Railway Ministry announced the link would be inaugurated in December 2010.

The electrified Narkhed-Amravati line finally opened in January 2014. Hiwarkhed's railway station was named Hiwarkhed railway station. It has a single platform.

References

Cities and towns in Amravati district